Manoj Punjabi (born 7 December  1972) is an Indonesian film and television producer. He is the CEO & Founder of MD Entertainment, the biggest production house in Indonesia and the only national film company listed on the Indonesia Stock Exhange (IDX:FILM)

Manoj is the man behind “KKN Di Desa Penari,” the highest grossing movie of all time in Indonesia. An influential personality at the forefront of Indonesian cinema, Manoj Punjabi is Indonesia’s most commercially successful film and television producer as well as the founder and CEO of MD Entertainment, Indonesia’s largest media company. Manoj Punjabi is responsible for 7 of the top 20 of Indonesia’s highest-grossing box-office films, record-breaking soap operas, as well as the popularization of an entire movie genre (horror) in Indonesia. Aside from countless big-screen films and television shows, Manoj has also diversified into music, animation, and of late, has established himself as the most prominent digital content producer in Indonesia, quickly garnering the largest market share. Manoj Punjabi has become one of the most influential trendsetters in Indonesian pop-culture, and is thereby responsible for broadening perspectives and shaping Indonesian society.

Family 
Manoj Punjabi is of Indian Sindhi descent. He is married to Shania Punjabi and has 3 children.

Filmography
 Best Friend? (2004)
 Dead Time: Kala (2007)
 Ayat-Ayat Cinta (2008)
 Love in Perth (2010)
 Under the Protection of Ka'Bah (film) (2011)
 Habibie & Ainun (2012)
 Tak Kemal Maka Tak Sayang (2014)
 Merry Riana: Mimpi Sejuta Dollar (2014)
 Surga Yang Tak Dirindukan (2015)
 Talak 3 (2016)
 Rudy Habibie (2016)
 Surga Yang Tak Dirindukan 2 (2017)
 Danur 1: I Can See Ghost  (2017)
 Stip & Pensil  (2017)
 Insya Allah Sah (2017)
 A: Aku, Benci, & Cinta (2017)
 Ruqyah: The Exorcism (2017)
 Gasing Tengkorak (2017)
 Ayat-Ayat Cinta 2 (2017)
 Danur 2: Maddah  (2018)
 Ananta (2018)
 Alas Pati: Hutan Mati (2018)
 Insya Allah Sah 2 (2018)
 DOA (Doyok-Otoy-Ali Oncom): Cari Jodoh (2018)
 Bisikan Iblis (2018)
 Asih (2018)
 Hanum & Rangga: Faith & The City (2018)
 Silam (2018)
 Perjanjian dengan Iblis (2019)
 Matt & Mou (2019)
 Satu Suro (2019)
 MatiAnak (2019)
 Death Whisper (2019)
 Devil's Whisper (2019)
 Mendadak Kaya (2019)
 Twivortiare (2019)
 Danur 3: Sunyaruri (2019)
 Habibie & Ainun 3 (2019)
 Dignitate (2020)
 Sabar Ini Ujian (2020)
 Pelukis Hantu (2020)
 Malapataka (2020)
 Asih 2 (2020)
 KKN di Desa Penari (2022) 

Television
 Cinta Fitri (2007-2011)
 Bayu Cinta Luna (2009-2010)
 Kesetiaan Cinta (2009-2010)

References

External links 
 
 MD Entertainment, official website
 Kapan Lagi
 Profile Manoj Punjabi at MD Entertainment

Indonesian film producers
Living people
Indonesian Hindus
Indonesian people of Indian descent
Soap opera producers
Indonesian television producers
People from Jakarta
Indonesian people of Sindhi descent
1972 births